Alle Kvinners Blad (Norwegian: Every Woman's Magazine) is a former Norwegian language weekly magazine published between 1937 and 1978 in Oslo, Norway.

History and profile
Alle Kvinners Blad was established in 1937 by the publishing house Gyldendal Norsk Forlag. The magazine was published on a weekly basis. In 1963 the name of the magazine was changed to Alle kvinner. The magazine was owned by the publishing house Nordisk Forlag from 1974 to 1978, when it ceased publication. Its last editor was Toppen Bech.

Circulation
The circulation of Alle Kvinners Blad reached a peak of 275,000 copies in 1950, making it the second best-selling weekly magazine in Norway at the time.

References

1937 establishments in Norway
1978 disestablishments in Norway
Defunct magazines published in Norway
Magazines established in 1937
Magazines disestablished in 1978
Magazines published in Oslo
Norwegian-language magazines
Weekly magazines published in Norway
Women's magazines published in Norway